The men's 5000 metres was one of seven track cycling events on the Cycling at the 1908 Summer Olympics programme. Its distance was the median of the individual event distances. Each nation could enter up to 12 cyclists.

Competition format

The 5000 metres was a sprint-style race, though considerably longer than modern sprints. The time limit for the race was 9 minutes, 25 seconds. The competition was conducted in two rounds (semifinals and a final). The semifinal round comprised 7 semifinals, each with up to 9 cyclists. The winning cyclist in each semifinal advanced to the final, so long as the time limit was not exceeded.

Results

Semifinals

The best cyclist in each of the 7 semifinals advanced to the final.

Semifinal 1

Semifinal 2

Demangel had finished first by inches, but was disqualified for fouling.

Semifinal 3

Semifinal 4

Semifinal 5

Semifinal 6

Semifinal 7

Final

Notes

Sources
 
 De Wael, Herman. Herman's Full Olympians: "Cycling 1908". Accessed 7 April 2006.

Men's 005000 metres
Track cycling at the 1908 Summer Olympics
Olympic track cycling events